The Jigawa State Executive Council (also known as, the Cabinet of Jigawa State) is the highest formal governmental body that plays important roles in the Government of Jigawa State headed by the Governor of Jigawa State. It consists of the Deputy Governor, Secretary to the State Government, and Commissioners who preside over ministerial departments.

Functions
The Executive Council exists to advise and direct the Governor. Their appointment as members of the Executive Council gives them the authority to execute power over their fields.

Current cabinet
The current Executive Council are serving under the Mohammed Badaru Abubakar administration.

References

Jigawa
Jigawa State